Botev is a Bulgarian football club based in Galabovo, Stara Zagora Province. The club last played in the Second League, the second division of Bulgarian football, having been promoted as champions of the South-Eastern V Group in 2012–13. The club was founded in 1945. Botev's home ground is the Energetik Stadium, a 3,000 all-seater stadium.

At the end of the 1969–70 season, Botev reached the second tier of Bulgarian football for the first time in their history. However, they were relegated the following season despite their efforts.

History 
Botev Galabovo was founded in 1945. The team has never played in the Bulgarian first tier, spending their entire history bouncing between the second and third tiers. 

In 2019, Botev reached the quarter-finals of the Bulgarian Cup, beating FC Vitosha Bistritsa in the round of 16, with a score of 2-1.

In May 2020, Botev was disqualified from the 2019-20 season in the second tier due to financial problems. The team then refused to be admitted into the third tier for the upcoming season, instead opting to start from the fourth regional league.

Honours 
South-Eastern V Group:
  Winners (1): 2012–13

Current squad 

For recent transfers, see Transfers summer 2019 and Transfers winter 2019–20.

League positions

References

External links 
 Club profile at bgclubs.eu
 Official website

Football clubs in Bulgaria
1945 establishments in Bulgaria